Aleksandr Nedovyesov (born 15 February 1987), formerly known as Oleksandr Nedovyesov, is a Ukrainian-Kazakhstani professional tennis player. He reached his highest ATP singles ranking of world No. 72 on 21 April 2014 and his highest doubles ranking of world No. 54 on 15 August 2022. He has reached two doubles ATP finals partnering Aisam-ul-Haq Qureshi both in 2022. He represented Ukraine until December 2013.

He competes mainly on the ATP Challenger Tour, both in singles and doubles. Nedovyesov has reached 17 career singles finals, posting a record of 9 wins and 8 losses which includes 3 ATP Challenger Tour titles. Additionally, he has reached 57 doubles finals, posting a record of 35 wins and 22 losses which includes 22 ATP Challenger Tour titles.

Career

2004–2005: World No. 33 in Juniors
As a junior, Nedovyesov had a singles win–loss record of 29–16. His best showing at a junior grand slam tournament in singles was reaching the second round in both the 2004 French Open and 2004 Wimbledon Championships. His best showing in doubles was at the 2004 Wimbledon Championships where he reached the quarterfinals alongside Nikita Kryvonos.
He reached a career high of world No. 33 in the ITF Juniors rankings on 10 January 2005.

2013–2014: Grand Slam singles and doubles debut, Career high ranking
Aleksandr made his first appearance in the main draw of a Major at the 2014 Australian Open, where he lost to Tomáš Berdych in straight sets.  He reached a career-high ranking of No. 72 in April 2014.

At the French Open, he recorded his first victory at a Grand Slam event with victory over Somdev Devvarman, he again met Berdych in the second round, this time winning a set before losing in four.

Nedovyesov made his Grand Slam doubles debut at the 2014 Wimbledon Championships where he partnered up with Russian player Dmitry Tursunov. In the first round they defeated Benoît Paire and Tomasz Bednarek 6–7(4-7), 7–6(7–3), 7–6(7–2), 6–2. In the second round, they faced sixth seeds Julian Knowle and Marcelo Melo and were defeated in straight sets 1–6, 6–7(9–11), 3–6.

2021–2022: Seven Challenger titles and Two ATP finals
He reached an ATP final at the 2022 Melbourne Summer Set 1 for the first time in his career partnering Aisam-ul-Haq Qureshi.

At the 2022 Australian Open he again partnered with Qureshi to win his first doubles match at this Major and only his second Grand Slam win in doubles in his career where they defeated seventh seeded pair of Nicolas Mahut and Fabrice Martin.
At the 2022 Delray Beach Open he reached his second ATP final with Qureshi.

ATP career finals

Doubles: 2 (2 runners-up)

ATP Challenger and ITF Futures finals

Singles: 17 (9–8)

Doubles: 59 (36–23)

References

External links
 
 

1987 births
Living people
Ukrainian male tennis players
Kazakhstani male tennis players
People from Alushta
Tennis players at the 2014 Asian Games
Tennis players at the 2018 Asian Games
Asian Games medalists in tennis
Asian Games gold medalists for Kazakhstan
Asian Games bronze medalists for Kazakhstan
Ukrainian emigrants to Kazakhstan
Naturalised citizens of Kazakhstan
Naturalised tennis players
Medalists at the 2014 Asian Games
Medalists at the 2018 Asian Games
Oklahoma State Cowboys tennis players